Orthocomotis oxapampae is a species of moth of the family Tortricidae. It is found in Peru.

Its wingspan is 28 mm. The ground colour of the forewings is whitish cream with indistinct brownish admixture. The hindwings are pale greyish brown with darker strigulation (fine streaks).

Etymology
The species name refers to the name of the type locality, Oxapampa.

References

Moths described in 2010
Orthocomotis